Ryan James Otten (born April 7, 1990) is a former American football tight end  He was signed by the Jacksonville Jaguars as an undrafted free agent in 2013. He played college football at San Jose State.

Early life
Otten was born in Carmichael, California and graduated from Del Oro High School in Loomis, California in 2008. As a senior in 2007, Otten was a first-team All-NorCal selection by Scout.com. Additionally, Otten won the National Football Foundation High School Scholar-Athlete Award in 2007.

College career
At San Jose State University, Otten redshirted his freshman year in 2008 then played for the San Jose State Spartans football team from 2009 to 2012. As a redshirt freshman in 2009 under coach Dick Tomey, Otten played all 12 games with 7 starts and had 10 receptions for 78 yards. In 2010 as a sophomore playing under new coach Mike MacIntyre, Otten had 17 receptions for 201 yards and 3 touchdowns in 6 games; he missed 6 games due to injury. Otten's role on the team earned comparisons to former Dallas Cowboys tight end Doug Cosbie: "catching third-down passes in traffic and sneaking behind the defense for long gains," as San Jose Mercury News sportswriter Jon Wilner put it.

As a junior in 2011, Otten played 11 games, with 52 receptions for 739 yards and 5 touchdowns, becoming one of the best receiving tight ends in the nation. He was also a first-team All-WAC and honorable mention Sports Illustrated All-American selection in a season where San Jose State improved from 1-12 in 2010 to 5-7.

In his senior season in 2012, a season where San Jose State went 11-2 including  a victory in the 2012 Military Bowl, Otten played all 13 games and had 47 receptions for 742 yards and 4 touchdowns. Again, Otten was a first-team All-WAC selection and Sports Illustrated honorable mention All-American in 2012. Otten led all Division I FBS tight ends in yards per catch with 15.8 in 2012.

Professional career

Jacksonville Jaguars
After going undrafted in the 2013 NFL Draft, Otten signed with the Jacksonville Jaguars as an undrafted free agent on Monday April 29, 2013. He was released on August 30, 2013.

San Diego Chargers
On October 9, 2013, Otten was signed to the San Diego Chargers' practice squad. Otten signed a future contract with the Chargers on January 16, 2014. The Chargers released Otten on August 25, 2014.

Cincinnati Bengals
On September 9, 2014, the Cincinnati Bengals signed Otten to the practice squad. On September 16, the Bengals cut Otten.

Minnesota Vikings
The Minnesota Vikings signed Otten to the practice squad on November 12, 2014 and released Otten on May 7, 2015.

References

External links
Jacksonville Jaguars bio
San Diego Chargers bio

1990 births
Living people
American football tight ends
Jacksonville Jaguars players
San Diego Chargers players
Minnesota Vikings players
People from Carmichael, California
People from Placer County, California
Players of American football from California
San Jose State Spartans football players
Sportspeople from Sacramento County, California